Ləkər (also, Ləkar and Lyakar) is a village in the Lerik Rayon of Azerbaijan.  The village forms part of the municipality of Bürsülüm.

References 

Populated places in Lerik District